Glen Wallace is a Northern Irish actor, known for portraying the role of Malachy Fisher on the Channel 4 soap opera Hollyoaks.

Career
In 2007, Wallace made his debut appearance in the Channel 4 soap opera Hollyoaks as Malachy Fisher. After a three-episode appearance, he was contracted as a series regular. In 2010, Wallace was nominated for Best Actor and Best Dramatic Performance at the British Soap Awards. Wallace quit Hollyoaks later in 2010, and made his final appearance on 18 November 2010, where his character Malachy died from serious injuries after an explosion from the local restaurant. Wallace appeared in two episodes of Holby City as Andy Bryan in August 2011. From 2014 to 2016, he appeared in the BBC soap opera EastEnders as DS Cameron Bryant. In December 2016, Wallace joined the Scottish soap opera River City as series regular Grieg Roth, a role he played until 2018. In 2021, he joined the cast of the ITV soap opera Coronation Street as Lucas. He has also been in Jamie Johnson since the show moved production to Wales in series 4 when he first joined playing as Duncan Jones, the manager of the football club called Phoenix FC.

Awards and nominations

References

External links
 

21st-century male actors from Northern Ireland
Living people
Male film actors from Northern Ireland
Male television actors from Northern Ireland
Male soap opera actors from Northern Ireland
People from Ballymena
Year of birth missing (living people)